Leucocyte may refer to:
White blood cells,  the cells of the immune system
Leucocyte (album), a 2008 album by jazz band Esbjörn Svensson Trio